The Funkees were a Nigerian afro-rock group formed in the late 1960s. They moved to London in 1973 and quickly gained prominence in the expatriate West African and West Indian music scene, but fragmented four years later. They specialized in funky, upbeat, highly danceable afro-rock that often featured lyrics sung in Igbo, as well as English. Originating as an army band after the Nigerian Civil War, they contributed to the outpouring of upbeat music produced by young people in Nigeria in response to the darkness of the recently concluded civil conflict. In 2012, Soundway Records reissued a compilation of their recordings from the mid-1970s, leading to a resurgence of interest in the band.

Members
 Harry Mosco — guitar, vocals, gong
 Chyke Madu — drums, vocals
 Sonny Akpabio — congas
 Jake N. Sollo — guitar, organ, piano, vocals
 Danny Heibs — bass, vocals, percussion
 Tony Mallett
 Mohammed Ahidjo — vocals, percussion
 Roli Paterson — bongos

Discography
 1974 — Point of No Return
 1976 — Now I'm A Man
 2012 — Dancing Time: The Best of Eastern Nigeria's Afro Rock Exponents 1973-77 (reissue compilation)

References

External links
The Funkees @ Discogs
The Funkees @ Allmusic

Nigerian rock music groups